Oleg Sidorov (born September 15, 1983) is an Uzbek former swimmer, who specialized in breaststroke events. Sidorov qualified for the men's 100 m breaststroke at the 2004 Summer Olympics in Athens, by achieving a FINA B-standard of 1:04.91 from the Russian Championships in Moscow. He challenged seven other swimmers in heat two, including three-time Olympians Jean Luc Razakarivony of Madagascar and Yevgeny Petrashov of Kyrgyzstan. He rounded out the field to last place by more than half a second (0.50) behind Petrashov in 1:08.30. Sidorov failed to advance into the semifinals, as he placed fifty-sixth overall out of 60 swimmers on the first day of preliminaries.

References

1983 births
Living people
Sportspeople from Tashkent
Uzbekistani male breaststroke swimmers
Olympic swimmers of Uzbekistan
Swimmers at the 2004 Summer Olympics
20th-century Uzbekistani people
21st-century Uzbekistani people